The 2020 Armed Forces Bowl was a college football bowl game played on January 4, 2020, with kickoff at 11:30 a.m. EST (10:30 a.m. local CST) on ESPN. It was the 17th edition of the Armed Forces Bowl, and was one of the 2019–20 bowl games concluding the 2019 FBS football season. Sponsored by aerospace and defense company Lockheed Martin, the game was officially known as the Lockheed Martin Armed Forces Bowl.

Teams
The game featured the Southern Miss Golden Eagles of Conference USA (C-USA) against the Tulane Green Wave of the American Athletic Conference (The American). This was the 31st all-time meeting between the two programs; the Golden Eagles entered the game leading the all-time series, 23–7. This was the first Armed Forces Bowl appearance for both programs.

From 1996 to 2013, Southern Miss and Tulane were both in C-USA as charter members, before Tulane left to join the American in 2014. Their regular season rivalry is set to resume in 2022. Since 1999, a bell trophy has been awarded to the winner of their rivalry game, making it the Battle for the Bell; the bell was also on the line in this Armed Forces Bowl.

Southern Miss Golden Eagles

Southern Miss entered the game with a 7–5 record (5–3 in conference). They finished in third place in the West Division of C-USA. The Golden Eagles also lost to the only ranked opponent they faced, Alabama. Southern Miss was 7–3 before losing their final two regular season games.

Tulane Green Wave

Tulane entered the game with a 6–6 record (3–5 in conference). They finished in fourth place in The American's West Division. The Green Wave lost to the only ranked opponent that they faced, Auburn. After starting their season 5–1, Tulane went 1–5 in the second half of their regular season.

Game summary

Statistics

References

External links

Game statistics at statbroadcast.com

Armed Forces Bowl
Armed Forces Bowl
Armed Forces Bowl
Armed Forces Bowl
Southern Miss Golden Eagles football bowl games
Tulane Green Wave football bowl games